Heinous Peak is a prominent peak rising to about ,  north-northeast of Mount Crockett and  southeast of Mount Vaughan in the Hays Mountains of the Queen Maud Mountains, Antarctica. The peak was climbed on November 28, 1987, by four members of the United States Antarctic Research Program – Arizona State University geological party led by Edmund Stump, and was so named because the ascent was a 20-hour ordeal in technical ice climbing on very steep terrain.

References

Mountains of the Ross Dependency
Amundsen Coast